Henry Haney may refer to:

 Henry Ryan Haney (1835–1878), Ontario physician and political figure
 Henry P. Haney (1846–1923), American last survivor of The Great Locomotive Chase during the American Civil War